Fitzroy Junior Dunkley (born 20 May 1993) is a Jamaican sprinter. He represented his country at the 2016 IAAF World Indoor Championships reaching semifinals individually and finishing fourth in the relay.

His personal bests in the event are 45.06 seconds outdoors (Eugene 2016) and 46.04 seconds indoors (Fayetteville 2016).

Competition record

1Did not start in the semifinals

References

External links
 

1993 births
Living people
Jamaican male sprinters
Place of birth missing (living people)
Athletes (track and field) at the 2016 Summer Olympics
Olympic athletes of Jamaica
Olympic silver medalists for Jamaica
Olympic silver medalists in athletics (track and field)
LSU Tigers track and field athletes
Medalists at the 2016 Summer Olympics